Vincent O. Pellecchia (February 14, 1916 – February 17, 1989) was an American politician who served in the New Jersey General Assembly from 1972 to 1988, representing the District 14 at-large seat in his first term of office and the 35th Legislative District starting in 1974, when the 40-district map was implemented.

References

1916 births
1989 deaths
Democratic Party members of the New Jersey General Assembly
Politicians from Paterson, New Jersey
20th-century American politicians